The Territorial Prelature of Chuquibamba is a Roman Catholic territorial prelature located in the city of Chuquibamba in the Ecclesiastical province of Arequipa in Peru.

History
On 5 June 1962, the Territorial Prelature of Chuquibamba was established.

Ordinaries
 Prelates of Chuquibamba (Roman rite)
Redento Maria Gauci, O. Carm. (5 June 1962 – February 1977)
Lorenzo Miccheli Filippetti, O.S.A. (12 August 1976 – 16 July 1986)
Luis Baldo Riva, C.Ss.R. (27 June 1977 – 27 June 1983)
Felipe María Zalba Elizalde, O.P. (29 February 1984 – 19 October 1999)
Mario Busquets Jordá (25 January 2001 – 11 May 2015)
Jorge Izaguirre Rafael, CSC (11 May 2015 – present)

References

Sources
 GCatholic.org
 Catholic Hierarchy

Roman Catholic dioceses in Peru
Roman Catholic Ecclesiastical Province of Arequipa
Christian organizations established in 1962
Roman Catholic dioceses and prelatures established in the 20th century
Territorial prelatures
1962 establishments in Peru